The Symphony No. 11, Op. 384, nicknamed Romantique, is a work for orchestra by French composer Darius Milhaud. The piece was written in 1960 on a joint commission from the Dallas Symphony Orchestra and the Dallas Public Library, and received its premiere under conductor Paul Kletzki.

Milhaud's Eleventh Symphony is a three-movement work with a total running time of about 19 minutes. The titles of the movements, as descriptive of their character as of tempo, are as follows:
 Intense (approx. 4'20")
 Méditatif (approx. 9'30")
 Emporté (approx. 5'15")

This symphony is published by Heugel & Cie. Recordings of this symphony include a 1995 all-digital recording by Alun Francis and the Radio-Sinfonieorchester Basel, part of a boxed set of Milhaud's Symphonies No. 1–12 on CPO.

References

External links 
Video - Darius Milhaud - Symphony No. 11 (1 of 2) (14:02).
Video - Darius Milhaud - Symphony No. 11 (2 of 2) (05:24).

Symphony 11
1960 compositions
Music commissioned by the Dallas Symphony Orchestra